Nick Traina (born Nicholas John Steel Toth; May 1, 1978 – September 20, 1997) was the lead singer for the punk band Link 80.

Life
Traina was the son of Danielle Steel and William George Toth.

Traina died by suicide by overdosing on lithium at the age of 19.

Career
Traina started his first band, Shanker, at age 13 with Max Leavitt. He joined Link 80 at age 16 and played with them for three years, touring extensively. After leaving Link 80 in August 1997, Traina formed a new band called Knowledge and recorded a demo with them that has since been released on Asian Man Records.  A song titled "Gnat" was included on the release; the song was recorded years earlier with Leavitt.

Discography
With Link 80:
 Remember How It Used To Be EP (1995)
 Rumble At The Tracks EP (1996)
 17 Reasons (1996)
 Killing Katie (1997)

With Knowledge:
 A Gift Before I Go (1998)

References

External links
Link 80

1978 births
1997 suicides
American punk rock musicians
Place of birth missing
Place of death missing
20th-century American singers
20th-century American male singers
1997 deaths